Fred Douglas Roberts (January 28, 1873 – death date unknown) was an American Negro league second baseman in the 1900s.

A native of Danville, Illinois, Roberts made his Negro leagues debut in 1903 with the Leland Giants. He played with the club for several seasons before finishing his career with the St. Paul Colored Gophers in 1907.

References

External links
 and Seamheads

1873 births
Place of death missing
Year of death missing
Leland Giants players
St. Paul Colored Gophers players
Baseball second basemen
Baseball players from Illinois
People from Danville, Illinois